The Gunflint and Lake Superior Railroad (G&LS) is a defunct Minnesota logging railroad that operated in the Thunder Bay District of northwestern Ontario and in Cook County of northeastern Minnesota.

The G&LS was built in 1902 by the Pigeon River Lumber Company to harvest primarily white pine and norway pine from the eastern side of Gunflint Lake. The logs were then transported to the company's sawmill in Port Arthur to be processed.

The line originated at the Canadian Northern Railway-Duluth Extension (PAD&W Railway) at Little Gunflint Lake, crossed the Canada–United States border, travelled along the east side of Gunflint Lake south to Crab Lake, and then east to Whisker Lake. This line was used until 1909 when it was abandoned and a forest fire destroyed a 1000-foot trestle on the PAD&W at North Lake and severed the line. The rails were removed circa 1915-1916.

Locomotives

References

External links
"Gunflint and Lake Superior Videos", by D. Battistel. YouTube.
"Shay Locomotive SN-683" 

Defunct Ontario railways
Defunct Minnesota railroads
Logging railways in Canada